Frank T. Hassa was a member of the Wisconsin State Assembly.

Biography
Hassa was born on June 6, 1873, in Lenox, Massachusetts. He moved to Wisconsin in 1879, settling in Milwaukee, Wisconsin. He was educated at St. Stanislaus' Parochial school, and the public schools of Milwaukee.

Career
Hassa was elected to the Assembly as a Democrat in 1902, receiving 1,686 votes. He defeated Republican Dr. W.S. Mount, who received 1,484 votes, and Social Democrat Willis C. Acker, who received 1,006 votes. Previously, he had been employed at the Allis-Chalmers pattern shop for over a decade.

References

External links
The Political Graveyard

People from Lenox, Massachusetts
Politicians from Milwaukee
Democratic Party members of the Wisconsin State Assembly
1873 births
Year of death missing